Chandmani is a sum (district) of Khovd Province in western Mongolia. It is 160 km away from the city of Khovd.

References 

Districts of Khovd Province